Donald Keith Hayward (born 26 September 1932) is a former Australian politician.

He was born in Broken Hill to James Keith Hayward and Elsa Margaret, née Egan. He attended Broken Hill High School and Homebush Boys High School before studying at Melbourne and Sydney universities, receiving a Bachelor of Laws from the former. In 1953 he was appointed private secretary to the Minister for National Development, then in 1955 he was appointed private secretary to the President of the Senate. He moved to the private sector in 1958, working for General Motors-Holden where he rose to the positions of public relations director (1966–71), and company director (1966–72, 1978–79).  In 1971 he transferred to General Motors Overseas Corporation and held various positions in Southeast Asia, including President and managing director of General Motors Philippines (1972–1976). He was also a member of University of Melbourne's law faculty from 1967 to 1972.

A Liberal Party member since 1951, he was elected to the Victorian Legislative Council in 1979 as one of two members for Monash. In 1985 he transferred to the Legislative Assembly, winning the seat of Prahran. He became Shadow Minister for Education in 1990 and Minister for Education in 1992, serving until his retirement in 1996. After his retirement he joined various government and private sector boards as a non-executive director, including Abigroup (1997-2004).

Minister for Education 
As Minister for Education, he implemented a reform program for Victorian Schools called “Schools of the Future”.  
 Following the closure of Richmond Secondary College in 1992, he made the decision in 1993 to open a new school for young women–Melbourne Girls' College, which opened in 1994.

Autobiography 
His autobiography was published in e-book format on 11 November 2016.

References

 

1932 births
Living people
Liberal Party of Australia members of the Parliament of Victoria
Members of the Victorian Legislative Assembly